Turkey Creek is a stream in Benton and Hickory counties in the U.S. state of Missouri.
It is a tributary of the Osage River.

The headwaters arise in northern Hickory County just east of U.S. Route 65 southeast of Cross Timbers. The stream flows northwest to north into Benton County and to the east of Fristoe. It crosses under Missouri Route 7 southeast of Majorville and meanders north to enter the Osage River arm of the Lake of the Ozarks just east of Old Fredonia and six miles east of Warsaw.

Turkey Creek was named for the wild turkeys in the area.

See also
List of rivers of Missouri

References

Sources 
 
 
 

Rivers of Benton County, Missouri
Rivers of Hickory County, Missouri
Rivers of Missouri